The Geelvink pygmy parrot  (Micropsitta geelvinkiana) is a species of parrot in the family Psittacidae endemic to Biak and Numfoor islands in Western New Guinea. The name Geelvink comes from a Dutch ship and family called Geelvinck. It has two subspecies; the nominate occurs on Numfor, and M. g. misoriensis on Biak.

Description 
It has a brown head, blue crown, light blue ear covert, yellow breast, green body and blue tail. It has red eyes. The female has less brown than the male.

Diet 
It feeds on lichen, fungi, seeds, fruits, flowers, insects and their larvae.

Habitat 
Its natural habitats are subtropical or tropical moist lowland forests and rural gardens. It is threatened by habitat loss.

References

Geelvink pygmy parrot
Birds of the Schouten Islands
Endemic fauna of the Biak–Numfoor rain forests
Geelvink pygmy
Geelvink pygmy
Geelvink pygmy parrot
Geelvink pygmy parrot
Parrot, Geelvink pygmy
Parrot, Geelvink pygmy
Geelvink pygmy parrot
Taxonomy articles created by Polbot